Barlovento (Spanish for "windward") may refer to:

 Barlovento, Santa Cruz de Tenerife, Canary Islands
 Barlovento, Venezuela, Miranda
 "Barlovento", a song by Venezuelan composer Eduardo Serrano
 Barlovento (harvestman), a genus of harvestman (Agoristenidae)

See also 
 Barlavento (disambiguation) (Portuguese)